Kushang Patel (born 13 September 1991) is an Indian first-class cricketer who plays for Saurashtra. He made his first-class debut for Gujarat in the 2012–13 Ranji Trophy on 17 November 2012. He made his List A debut for Saurashtra in the 2016–17 Vijay Hazare Trophy on 25 February 2017. He made his Twenty20 debut for Saurashtra in the 2017–18 Zonal T20 League on 8 January 2018.

He was the leading wicket-taker for Saurashtra in the 2018–19 Vijay Hazare Trophy, with seventeen dismissals in six matches.

References

External links
 

1991 births
Living people
Indian cricketers
Jharkhand cricketers
Cricketers from Surat